Lukas Barry Bilyk (born November 10, 1994) is a Canadian actor. He is best known for his role as Drew Torres in Degrassi: The Next Generation, which he starred on from 2010 to 2015. He is also recognized for his roles in films such as Kiss and Cry (2017) and F the Prom (2017).

Early life 
Born in North York, Ontario, Canada, Bilyk grew up in nearby Vaughan, Ontario with three older sisters. He is of Italian, Ukrainian, German, and Jewish descent. Bilyk attended St. Elizabeth Catholic High School in Thornhill, where he was part of the Regional Arts Program for Drama.

Career 
Bilyk had a recurring role as Mark in season 5 of Lost Girl.

Bilyk had a starring role as Drew Torres on Degrassi: The Next Generation. His character developed over time; starting as an immature jock and ending as class president with a promising future.

Personal life 

In December 2021, Bilyk got engaged to director Nicole Dorsey, whom he has been dating since 2015. They have a son, Elliot Rae Bilyk, born in August 2022.

Filmography

Film

Television

References

External links
 

1994 births
Living people
21st-century Canadian male actors
Canadian male child actors
Canadian male film actors
Canadian male television actors
Canadian people of Italian descent
Male actors from Toronto
People from North York
People from Vaughan